Tunheim is an abandoned coal mining village on Bear Island, Svalbard, Norway. It lies in the northeast of the Island, a few kilometers east of the Bjørnøya Radio Station, & directly adjacent to Kapp Bergersen. To its south is Miseryfjellet, the tallest mountain on Bear Island.

Coal mining activities were at their height around 1916–1925 and 182 people lived in the village's 25 houses.

A radio station was built in 1919 and a meteorological station in 1923. The stations were destroyed by the Allies in 1941 during WWII to prevent the Germans from using them, and the town was evacuated.

References

Bear Island (Norway)
Former populated places in Svalbard